is a Japanese multinational corporation and conglomerate primarily involved in both terrestrial and aerospace transportation manufacturing. It is best known for its line of Subaru automobiles. Founded in 1953, the company was formerly named  (FHI) until 2017. The company's aerospace division is a defense contractor to the Japanese government, manufacturing Boeing and Lockheed Martin helicopters and airplanes under license. This same division is a global development and manufacturing partner to both companies.

History
Fuji Heavy Industries traces its roots to the Nakajima Aircraft Company, a leading supplier of airplanes to the Japanese government during World War II.  At the end of World War II, Nakajima was broken up by the Allied Occupation government under keiretsu legislation, and by 1950 part of the separated operation was already known as Fuji Heavy Industries.

FHI was incorporated on July 15, 1953, when five Japanese companies, known as Fuji Kogyo, Fuji Jidosha Kogyo, Omiya Fuji Kogyo, Utsunomiya Sharyo, and Tokyo Fuji Sangyo, joined to form one of Japan's largest manufacturers of transportation equipment.

By late 1980s, the company was a major supplier of military, aerospace and railroad equipment in Japan, but 80% of its sales came from automobiles. Sales in 1989 fell 15% to US$4.3 billion. In 1990, the company faced a loss of over US$500 million. Industrial Bank of Japan Ltd., the main bank of the company, asked Nissan Motor, which owned 4.2% of the company, to step in. Nissan sent Isamu Kawai, the president of Nissan Diesel Motor Co., to take charge of FHI. In 1991, FHI started contract-manufacturing Nissan Pulsar (Nissan Sunny in Europe) sedans and hatchbacks.

Currently, the Subaru Corporation makes Subaru brand cars, and its aerospace division makes utility and attack helicopters for the Japanese Self Defense Force, trainers, unmanned aerial vehicles, and the center wings of Boeing 777 and Boeing 787 jets. In the past, FHI made parts for the Raytheon Hawker and Eclipse Aviation business jets.

In 2003, the company adopted the logo of its Subaru automobile division as its worldwide corporate symbol.

On October 5, 2005 Toyota purchased 8.7% of FHI shares from General Motors, which had owned 20.1% since 1999. GM later divested its remaining 11.4% stake on the open market to sever all ties with FHI. FHI previously stated there might have been 27 million shares (3.4%) acquired before the start of trading by an unknown party on October 6, 2005, and speculation suggested a bank or perhaps another automaker was involved. After the purchase, Toyota announced a contract with Subaru on March 13, 2006 to use the underutilized Subaru manufacturing facility in Lafayette, Indiana, as well as plans to hire up to 1,000 workers and set aside an assembly line for the Camry, beginning in the second quarter of 2007.

In June 2014, the company entered into a contract with Boeing Commercial Airplanes, as one of five major Japanese companies contracted, to build parts for Boeing's 777X aircraft.

In May 2016, Fuji Heavy Industries announced that it would change its name to Subaru Corporation, with the change effective on April 1, 2017.

Divisions
Subaru has two main divisions:
 The automobile division, Subaru.
 The aerospace division is a contractor for the Japan Defense Agency and markets and sells both commercial and defense-related aircraft, helicopters and target drones. For the Japan Ground Self-Defence Force it has built the Bell UH-1 Iroquois, Bell AH-1 Cobra and Boeing AH-64 Apache helicopters. It will also be responsible for providing maintenance for the Bell-Boeing V-22 Osprey tilt rotor aircraft. This division previously built the FA-200 Aero Subaru and is currently participating in the Airbus A380, Boeing 777, Boeing 787, Hawker 4000 and Eclipse 500 programs, and supplies parts for Boeing 737, Boeing 747 and Boeing 767.

Former divisions
 Subaru discontinued the production of buses and railroad cars in 2003.
 The eco technology division manufactured and sold garbage trucks, robot sweepers, and wind turbines.
 Discontinued in 2017, the Subaru Industrial Power Products division manufactured and sold commercial engines, pumps and generators which were formerly under the Subaru-Robin and Robin brands. Subaru's industrial products division, began manufacturing "Star" engines for Polaris Industries snowmobiles in 1968 but engine manufacturing operations ended in 1998 when Polaris Industries started to build their own Liberty two-stroke engines. Subaru remains an invested partner with, and supplier of pistons to, Polaris. Subaru has provided more than 2 million engines used in Polaris snowmobiles, ATVs, watercraft and utility vehicles.

Products

Small automobiles

Bus models 

R13
13
3A/3B/3D/3E
R1/R2
R14
14
4B/4E
R15
5B/5E
R1/R2/R3
HD1/HD2/HD3
Double-decker
R16
6B/6E
H1
R17
7B/7E
7HD
7S
R18
8B/8E
R21
1M/1S

Aircraft 

 Fuji FA-200 Aero Subaru (1965) - monoplane/light aircraft
 Fuji/Rockwell Commander 700 (1975) - light transport
 Fuji KM-2 (1962) - light primary military trainer
 Fuji LM-1 Nikko (1955) - light communications military aircraft 
 Fuji T-1 (1958) - intermediate military jet trainer
 Fuji T-3/KM-2 (1974) - primary military trainer 
 Fuji T-5/KM-2 Kai (1984) - basic military trainer
 Fuji (Bell) UH-1H/UH-1J (1970s/1980s) - utility helicopter & troop carrier
 Fuji T-7/T-3 Kai (1998) - primary military trainer
Fuji TACOM UAV.
 Fuji (Boeing) AH-64DJP Apache (2001)
 Subaru-Bell UH-X - Ongoing project to meet the JGSDF's requirement for a UH-1J replacement. Bell Helicopter is Fuji's foreign partner in the competition. A variant of the UH-X may also ultimately fill the JMSDF's recently (October 2014) revealed requirement for a New Patrol Helicopter (to enter service in 2022).

Railway rolling stock 
Some products were built in Utsunomiya Sharyo Era(1950-1955).

Japan 
DMU
JR Hokkaido - KiHa 150 , KiHa 201 , KiHa 281 , KiHa 283 , and KiHa 261 series.
JR East - KiHa 100 and 110 series
JR Central - KiHa 85 series
JR Shikoku - 2000 series
Mōka Railway -  - The final products of railway rolling stock as Subaru
Chizu Express - HOT7000 series

JR East - E26 series

EMUJNR -  , 80 seriesTobu Railway - 300 , 2000 , 5000 , 6050 , 8000 , 9000 , 10000 , 30000 seriesTokyo subway - Teito Rapid Transit Authority (TRTA) 2000 series

TramTobu Railway - 100, 200 seriesTokyo Metropolitan Bureau of Transportation'' - 2500, 6000 type

Russia 
DMU -

Thailand 
DMU -

Notes

References

External links

 
  Wiki collection of bibliographic works on Fuji Heavy Industries

 
Companies listed on the Tokyo Stock Exchange
Manufacturing companies based in Tokyo
Aircraft manufacturers of Japan
Helicopter manufacturers of Japan
Defense companies of Japan
Robotics companies of Japan
Scooter manufacturers
Engine manufacturers of Japan
Bus manufacturers of Japan
Nissan
Mizuho Financial Group
Conglomerate companies of Japan
Japanese companies established in 1953
Vehicle manufacturing companies established in 1953
1960s initial public offerings
Multinational companies headquartered in Japan
Japanese brands
Toyota Group